Iolaus theodori, the Maessen's sapphire, is a butterfly in the family Lycaenidae. It is found in Ghana (the Volta Region) and Togo.

The larvae feed on Phragmanthera nigritana.

References

Butterflies described in 1970
Iolaus (butterfly)